The 1890 Delaware gubernatorial election was held on November 4, 1890. Incumbent Democratic Governor Benjamin T. Biggs was unable to seek a second consecutive term in office. Former State Treasurer Robert J. Reynolds won the Democratic nomination to succeed Biggs, and in the general election, he faced banker Harry A. Richardson, the Republican nominee. In stark contrast to the 1886 election, the Republican Party fully contested the state's elections and a close contest ensued. Reynolds ultimately defeated Richardson by a narrow margin, winning by just 543 votes.

General election

References

Bibliography
 Delaware Senate Journal, 83rd General Assembly, 1st Reg. Sess. (1891).

1890
Delaware
Gubernatorial
November 1890 events